Wilbur W. Cush (10 June 1928 – 28 July 1981) was a Northern Irish football striker.

Billy Cush represented Northern Ireland at the 1958 World Cup, scoring the winning goal in their first ever final stages World Cup match, a 1–0 win over Czechoslovakia in Sweden.

He started his career in his native Northern Ireland with Glenavon F.C. In 1951/52 he helped Glenavon become the first club from outside of Belfast to win the Irish League and 5 years later followed it up with a second league title.  In 1956/57, he was named as the Ulster Footballer of the Year. He moved to Leeds United in 1957 and took over the captaincy from recently departed Leeds legend John Charles. Cush was a very versatile player who could play at centre-back and centre-forward. His performances at Elland Road earned him his call up to Northern Ireland for the 1958 World Cup. Overall at Leeds he made 90 appearances and scored 9 goals. In 1960 he moved to Portadown F.C. later moving back to his first club, Glenavon F.C., as a player and later a coach. With his football career over, Wilbur became a butcher in Lurgan. He died in 1981.

Wilbur Cush was also a platoon Sergeant in the Ulster Special Constabulary. He served in Lurgan (J division County Armagh) and The Birches station County Armagh. He received the USC Long Service Medal.

See also
Ulster Footballer of the Year

References

External links
 
 Profile`

1928 births
1981 deaths
Association footballers from Northern Ireland
NIFL Premiership players
Northern Ireland international footballers
Ulster Footballers of the Year
1958 FIFA World Cup players
Glenavon F.C. players
Leeds United F.C. players
Portadown F.C. players
People from Lurgan
Association football wing halves